Władysław Krupa (29 December 1899 – 22 March 1969) was a Polish footballer. He played in one match for the Poland national football team in 1924.

References

External links
 

1899 births
1969 deaths
Polish footballers
Poland international footballers
Footballers from Kraków
Association football midfielders
Wisła Kraków players